Daniel Zwerdling is an American investigative journalist who has written for major magazines and newspapers.  From 1980 to 2018 he served as an investigative reporter for NPR News, with stints as foreign correspondent and host of Weekend All Things Considered from 1993 to 1999. Zwerdling retired from NPR in 2018.

Journalism career
Daniel Zwerdling was editor-in-chief at Montgomery Blair High School's student newspaper in Silver Spring, Maryland. He graduated from the University of Michigan in 1971.

He was a staff writer at The New Republic and a freelance reporter.

Zwerdling is most known for his work while at National Public Radio. From 1993 to 1999, he was senior host of NPR's Weekend All Things Considered. From 1999 to 2002, he was an investigative reporter for RadioWorks, NPR News. His layoff in 2002 provoked controversy among the NPR staff as the organization's decision to remove an investigative journalism line was seen as conflicting with NPR's mission. From 2002 to 2004, he was NPR's television correspondent on Now on PBS with Bill Moyers.

Some of his notable reports include investigative reports about the military's treatment of soldiers who have experienced trauma, the impact of fast food restaurants on animal rights, and the harmful substances in tobacco products. In 2006 and 2007, he reported that officers at Fort Carson were punishing soldiers, returning from the war in Iraq and Afghanistan with post traumatic stress disorder and other serious mental health problems.

He was an adjunct professor of Media Ethics at American University, and an associate of the Bard College Institute for Language and Thinking in New York.

His work has appeared in The New York Review of Books.

In 2018, Zwerdling retired from NPR amid several allegations of sexual harassment, though he has stated the allegations are false.

Awards
 2017 Alfred I. duPont for “Missed Treatment” (with Colorado Public Radio)
 2016 Robert F. Kennedy Journalism Award for “Injured Nurses”
 2016 NIHCM Foundation award, “Injured Nurses”
 2016 American Psychiatric Association Warren Williams Award, “Missed Treatment”
 2010 George Polk Award for the radio report "Brain Wars" (shared with ProPublica investigative reporter T. Christian Miller and NRP journalist Susanne Reber)
 2008 Alfred I. duPont–Columbia University Award
 2007 Robert F. Kennedy Journalism Award
 Edward R. Murrow Award
 Investigative Reporters and Editors award in 2004 for "Abuse of Immigrant Detainees"
 Overseas Press Club Foundation award for live coverage of breaking international news
 American Association for the Advancement of Science Journalism Award
 National Press Club Award for consumer reporting
 Ohio State awards for international reporting
 James Beard Foundation Award for a June 2002 report on the fast food industry, "McDonalds New Farm: Fast Food and Animal Rights" (radio long form category) and previously for a 1999 story in radio short category
 George Foster Peabody Award presented in 1995 for an NPR team report about the tobacco industry's use of dangerous chemical substances
 Champion-Tuck Award for economic reporting
 World Hunger Media Awards

Works
Workplace Democracy (Harper & Row, 1980)

References

External links
"NPR Investigative Reporter Daniel Zwerdling Retires Amid Sexual Misconduct Claims", NPR
"Daniel Zwerdling: The greatest question in journalism ", Stabile Center and the Columbia chapter of SPJ
"'On Location' with NPR is treat for InvestigateWest Editor", Investigate West, Rita Hibbard, 05/07/2010
"The Crisis in News: Broadcasting Panel", University of California: Berkeley
"McDonald's New Farm: Fast Food and Animal Rights" (American RadioWorks)

Living people
American male journalists
American University faculty and staff
Bard College faculty
NPR personalities
The New Republic people
Peabody Award winners
People from Silver Spring, Maryland
University of Michigan alumni
Year of birth missing (living people)